Dysart is a village in the Canadian province of Saskatchewan within the Rural Municipality of Lipton No. 217 and Census Division No. 6. The village is located east of Cupar and northwest of Lipton. It is about 91 km north of the City of Regina. The village was named for Dysart, Fife in Scotland.

History 
Dysart incorporated as a village on April 6, 1909.

Demographics 

See also 

 List of communities in Saskatchewan
 Villages of Saskatchewan

References

External links

Villages in Saskatchewan
Lipton No. 217, Saskatchewan
Division No. 6, Saskatchewan
Romanian-Canadian history